Football Club Alashkert, commonly known as Alashkert, is an Armenian football club based in the capital Yerevan, founded in 1990 in Martuni and after folding in 2000 re-founded in 2011. They currently play in the Armenian Premier League. The home stadium of the team is the Alashkert Stadium in Yerevan. The club headquarters are located on Saryan street 25, Yerevan. Although based in Yerevan they are in fact named after the historic Western Armenian town of Alashkert, now Eleşkirt in Eastern Turkey.

The club is owned by Bagrat Navoyan, a businessman and founder of Bagratour LLC.

Alashkert has a cooperation agreement with the Brazilian club Botafogo since August 2017.

History

Football Club Alashkert was founded in 1990 in the town of Martuni of Gegharkunik Province. In 1992, the team played in the Premier League representing Martuni and using the City Stadium of the town as their home venue. However, at the end of the season the team finished last in the table, being relegated to the First League. As a result, the club withdrew from the competition.

In 1998, FC Alashkert returned to professional football and participated in the First League finishing the table in 6th position. In 1999, they did not participate in the First League competition and later in early 2000, the club was dissolved.

Revival in 2011
In late 2011, FC Alashkert were re-founded by Bagrat Navoyan, a businessman native of Martuni. They entered the 2012–13 Armenian First League competition and won the championship, booking their place in the Armenian Premier League for the 2013–14 season. In 2012–2013, the team was managed by the former Armenian player Albert Sarkisyan and later by former footballer Sergey Erzrumyan. The assistant manager was Aram Hakobyan.

Relocation to Yerevan in 2013
In February 2013, the club purchased the Nairi Stadium in Yerevan, to become the official venue of their home games. As a result, the club was officially relocated from Martuni to Yerevan starting from the 2013–14 season.

In December 2017, Alashkert entered into partnerships with Brazilian clubs Botafogo and Fluminense.

On 21 September 2018, Varuzhan Sukiasyan was fired as manager with owner Bagrat Navoyan and Alashkert-2 manager Sergey Erzrumyan taking temporary charge.

Domestic record
League records of Alashkert FC:

Records
 Seasons in top division – 10 (1992–present)
 Lowest league position – 24 (1992)
 Biggest 'undefeated' streak in the league – 11 matches (10/05/15 – 19/09/15)
 Win record for season – 24 (2012–13) (First League)
 Loss record for season – 22 (1991) (Soviet Lower Second League)
 Most points in a season – 78 (2012–2013) (First League)
 Most league goals in a season (club) – 80 (2012–2013) (First League)
 All time League goals – 834 (since 1990)
 Most goals in a season (player) – 17,  Mihran Manasyan, 2013–14
 Biggest win – 6–0 vs  FC Artsakh, 2018
 Biggest defeat – 9–2 vs  Gandzasar Kapan, 2013
 Biggest home win – 6–0 vs  FC Artsakh, 2018
 Biggest home defeat – 5–0 vs  FC Pyunik, 2013
 Biggest away win – 4–0 vs  Gandzasar Kapan, 2018
 Biggest away defeat – 9–2 vs  Gandzasar Kapan, 2013
 Highest attendance ever – 59.047 vs  Celtic, 2018
 Highest attendance home game – 9.000 vs  CFR Cluj, 2018
 Highest attendance away game – 59.047 vs  Celtic, 2018
 Highest attendance in league or cup – 4.000 vs  Ararat, 2021 and vs  Lori Vanadzor, 2019
 All-time most appearances –  Artak Grigoryan, 198
 All-time top scorer –  Mihran Manasyan, 76

Europe
Alashkert first qualified for the Europa League 2015–16 qualification round 1, after gaining 4th place in the Armenian Premier League 2014–2015. In the first round Alashkert drew the Scottish club St Johnstone. Despite the fact that St Johnstone were considered as the favourites, Alashkert were victorious after the two games and were able to create a sensation. In the second round, Alashkert had to meet the Kazakh side Kairat. In the first game Alashkert were defeated 3–0. In the second game, Alashkert were able to achieve victory as a result of a last-minute winner scored by Heber Araujo, 2–1. However this was not enough to qualify for the third round.

Alashkert were the first ever Armenian side to play in a European group stage after defeating Kairat 3–2 on 12 August 2021. They played Rangers in the play-off for the Europa League, but lost 1–0 on aggregate. As a result, they dropped into the Europa Conference League group stage, where they were drawn in a group alongside Maccabi Tel Aviv, HJK Helsinki and LASK. After losing their first five matches, Alashkert managed to draw 1–1 against Maccabi Tel Aviv on matchday six, which was the first ever point earned by an Armenian side in any UEFA group stage.

European record 

Biggest win in UEFA competitions: 3–0 vs  FC Santa Coloma (5 July 2016) and  vs  Makedonija GP (18 July 2019)
Biggest defeat in UEFA competitions: 0–5 vs  CFR Cluj  (16 August 2018) 
Club appearances in UEFA competitions: 7
 Highest attendance – 59.047 vs  Celtic, 2018
Player with most UEFA appearances:  Artak Grigoryan – 29 appearances
Top scorer in UEFA competitions:  Uros Nenadovic – 4 goals
Goalkeeper with most clean sheets in UEFA competitions:  Ognjen Cancarevic – 5 matches

UEFA coefficient 
Last update: 12 August 2021

The following list ranks the current position of Alashkert in UEFA club ranking:

List of opponents by nation

List of opponents by club

Stadiums

Between 1990 and 2000, the club was based in the Martuni City Stadium in the town of Martuni, near the shores of Lake Sevan.

After the revival of the club in 2011, they were relocated to Yerevan, playing their home games in different stadiums of the capital city, mainly at the Nairi Stadium. However, Nairi Stadium – later renamed Alashkert Stadium – was purchased by the owners of FC Alashkert in February 2013.

Due to the large-scale renovation works at the Alashkert Stadium, Alashkert used the Vazgen Sargsyan Republican Stadium and Hrazdan Stadium during the 2013–14 Armenian Premier League season. Alashkert continue to use the Vazgen Sargsyan Republican Stadium to host European matches, due to Alashkert Stadium not meeting UEFA stadium category requirements.

The club returned to their own Alashkert Stadium during the 2014–15 Armenian Premier League season.

Honours
 Armenian Premier League:
 Winner (4): 2015–16, 2016–17, 2017–18, 2020–21
 Armenian Cup:
 Winner (1): 2018–19
 Runner Up (1): 2017–18
 Armenian First League:
 Winner (1): 2012–13
 Armenian Supercup:
 Winner (3): 2016, 2018, 2021

Current squad

Alashkert-2

The club's reserve squad plays as Alashkert-2 in the Armenian First League. They also play their home games at the Alashkert Stadium.

Youth teams
Alashkert run a small football school for youth teams on training pitches adjacent to the Alashkert Stadium in Yerevan. They also run a football school in the town of Masis in Ararat Province.

Personnel

Technical staff

Management

Managerial history
Managers of FC Alashkert since the club revived in late 2011:
  Albert Sarkisyan (1 January 2012 – 30 April 2013)
  Armen Sanamyan (30 April 2013 – 23 October 2013)
  Armen Gyulbudaghyants (2 November 2013 – 30 August 2014)
  Abraham Khashmanyan (31 August 2014 – 1 April 2018)
  Varuzhan Sukiasyan (1 April 2018 – 21 September 2018)
  Aram Voskanyan (25 September 2018 – 14 April 2019)
  Abraham Khashmanyan (15 April 2019 – 20 May 2021)
   Aleksandr Grigoryan (20 May 2021 –20 September 2021 )
  Milan Milanović (26 September 2021 – 13 January 2022)
  Aram Voskanyan (13 January 2022 – 30 June 2022)

References

External links
Official website
Club profile at uefa.com
Club profile at soccerway.com

 
Football clubs in Yerevan
Association football clubs established in 1990
1990 establishments in Armenia